The Wilder Shores of Love is a work of non-fiction by travel writer Lesley Blanch. It was first published in 1954. It is a colourful account of four women – Isabel Burton, Jane Digby, Aimée du Buc de Rivéry and Isabelle Eberhardt – who left Europe to live in the Middle East.

The title of the novel inspired subsequent works. A book of her travel writings entitled From Wilder Shores: The Tables of My Travels was published in 1989, and an anthology of her shorter work, collected by Georgia de Chamberet, is titled Lesley Blanch: On the Wilder Shores of Love.

References 

Books about the Middle East
British books
1954 non-fiction books
British travel books